The men's 110 metres hurdles event at the 1975 Summer Universiade was held at the Stadio Olimpico in Rome on 20 and 21 September.

Medalists

Results

Heats
Wind:Heat 1: +1.0 m/s, Heat 2: +1.2 m/s

Final

Wind: 0.0 m/s

References

Athletics at the 1975 Summer Universiade
1975